Zollie Kovacs (born c. 1935) was a Canadian football player who played for the Hamilton Tiger-Cats. He won the Grey Cup with them in 1957. He previously played football at and attended the University of Ottawa.

References

1935 births
Hamilton Tiger-Cats players
Living people